Hajjilar-e Shomali Rural District is in Hajjilar District of Chaypareh County, West Azerbaijan province, Iran. At the time of the 2006 National Census, the constituent villages of the rural district were in the former Hajjilar Rural District of Chaypareh District in Khoy County. There were 2,652 inhabitants in 672 households at the following census of 2011, by which time the district was separated from the county, established as Chaypareh County, and divided into two districts. At the most recent census of 2016, the population of the rural district was 2,579 in 693 households. The largest of its 27 villages was Shirin Bolagh, with 653 people.

References 

Chaypareh County

Rural Districts of West Azerbaijan Province

Populated places in West Azerbaijan Province

Populated places in Chaypareh County